Sowmaeh (also Romanized as Şowma‘eh and Şūme‘eh; also known as Şūmā) is a village in Kalkharan Rural District, in the Central District of Ardabil County, Ardabil Province, Iran. At the 2006 census, its population was 1,368, in 315 families.

References 

Tageo

Towns and villages in Ardabil County